Petrus Adrianus (Piet) Kerstens  (born 23 August 1896, in Ginneken – died 8 October 1958, in The Hague) was a Dutch politician and educator. He was minister of Economic Affairs, Agriculture and Fisheries in the second Gerbrandy cabinet from 1942 to 1944. After World War II he was a member of the Senate for the Catholic People's Party (KVP).

References 
  Parlement.com biography

1896 births
1958 deaths
Catholic People's Party politicians
20th-century Dutch politicians
Dutch educators
Members of the Senate (Netherlands)
Ministers of Agriculture of the Netherlands
Ministers of Economic Affairs of the Netherlands
People from Breda